Izatha balanophora is a moth of the family Oecophoridae. It is endemic to New Zealand, where it is widespread in the North Island. Larvae live off the dead bark of kānuka. The adult moths are on the wing during December to March.

Taxonomy 
This species was first described by Edward Meyrick in 1897 using a specimen collected by George Hudson in Wellington and named Semiocosma balanophora. The holotype specimen is held at the Natural History Museum, London. Alfred Philpott, thinking he was describing a new species, named the moth Izatha milligani in 1927. The holotype specimen Philpott used is held at the New Zealand Arthropod Collection. This name was synonymised by George Hudson in 1939.

Description 
Meyrick described the species as follows:

The wingspan is 19.5–27 mm for males and 23.5–31 mm for females. Pale specimens of I. balanophora can be confused with I. blepharidota however I. balanophora always has a wider an elongate dark patch along the forewing costa in comparison the narrow dash of I. blepharidota. This species could also be confused with weakly marked I. mesoschista and I. haumu but it lacks the curved black line in the forewing disc of the other two species.

Distribution 
This species is endemic to New Zealand. I. balanophora is widespread through the North Island but is regarded as uncommon. The speciesis likely unrecorded. It has been recorded Northland, Auckland, Waikato, Taranaki, Taupo, Rangitikei and Wellington districts. Although Hudson gave records of specimens from the South Island Robert J. B. Hoare hypothesised that these are likely I. manubriata.

Biology and behaviour 
Adults are on wing from December to March. This species occasionally comes to light.

Habitat and hosts 
Larvae have been reared from dead Kunzea ericoides and from an unidentified rotten log on the ground.

References

Oecophorinae
Moths of New Zealand
Endemic fauna of New Zealand
Moths described in 1897
Taxa named by Edward Meyrick
Endemic moths of New Zealand